Hubert Lafortune (born 24 November 1889, date of death unknown) was a Belgian gymnast who was part of the team that won silver at the  1920 Olympic Games in Antwerp.

His brothers Marcel Lafortune (4) and Jacques Lafortune (5), and nephew Frans Lafortune (7), made sixteen appearances between them at the Olympic Games for Belgium in shooting between 1924 and 1976.

References

External links
Hubert Lafortune's profile at Sports Reference.com
Biographical sketch of Hubert Lafortune 

1889 births
Year of death missing
Olympic gymnasts of Belgium
Belgian male artistic gymnasts
Olympic silver medalists for Belgium
Gymnasts at the 1920 Summer Olympics
Olympic medalists in gymnastics
Medalists at the 1920 Summer Olympics